Spiga may refer to:
 Kumonga
 Via della Spiga
 Spiga, a former name of Biga, Çanakkale, Turkey, a town and a former Latin Catholic titular bishopric